Leif Carlsson (born February 18, 1965) is a Swedish former professional ice hockey defenceman. He is currently the head coach of EV Landshut of the DEL2. Carlsson was selected by the Hartford Whalers in the 3rd round (61st overall) of the 1983 NHL Entry Draft.

References

External links

1965 births
Living people
AIK IF players
Färjestad BK players
Hartford Whalers draft picks
Swedish ice hockey coaches
Swedish ice hockey defencemen
People from Ludvika Municipality
Sportspeople from Dalarna County